The Irbit State Motorcycle Museum was created as a State Museum of the Russian Federation to protect the former IMZ Factory Museum from sale and dispersal. The museum was officially opened on June 25, 2004, as the Irbit Motorcycle Museum. The keystone of the museum was the collection of the Design Department of the IMZ factory acquired by local authorities in 2002. It is temporarily housed in a building at 100a Ulitsa Soviestskaya, in Irbit, while a permanent home is built in Ulitsa Lenina. It received the status of a State Museum of the Russian Federation on January 1, 2006. The museum contains an extensive collection of production, racing and prototype bikes from the IMZ-Ural Factory as well as many foreign models from a wide range of manufacturers. The collection is unique in its display of the development of the Russian heavy motorcycle.

Its current director is Alexandr Ilyitch Bulanov, a notable historian in the town of Irbit as well as a Guinness Book of Records-holder for Ural motorcycles.

Museums in Sverdlovsk Oblast
Motorcycle museums
Transport museums in Russia
Museums established in 2004
2004 establishments in Russia